Fred Isabella (August 3, 1917 – November 28, 2007) was an American dentist and politician.

Biography 
Born in Mechanicville, New York, Isabella served in the United States Army during World War II. He went to the Albany College of Pharmacy and Health Sciences and the University at Buffalo School of Dental Medicine. Isabella took graduated classes at New York University. He was a dentist in Schenectady, New York; Isabella and his wife also owned a pharmacy. From 1958 to 1974, Isabella served on the Schenectady City Council and was a Democrat. Then from 1975 to 1977, Isabella served in the New York State Senate. Isabella died in Schenectady, New York.

Notes

External links

1917 births
2007 deaths
People from Mechanicville, New York
Military personnel from New York (state)
New York University alumni
University at Buffalo alumni
American dentists
Businesspeople from New York (state)
Schenectady City Council members
Democratic Party New York (state) state senators
20th-century American politicians
20th-century American businesspeople
20th-century dentists
United States Army personnel of World War II